219th Division may refer to:

 219th Infantry Division (Wehrmacht)
 219th Rifle Division
 164th Marine Brigade

Military units and formations disambiguation pages